The 2010–11 FC Shakhtar Donetsk season saw the club complete a domestic treble, winning their sixth Ukrainian Premier League, seventh Ukrainian Cup and third Ukrainian Super Cup. Shakhtar also competed in the UEFA Champions League, reaching the quarter-finals before being eliminated by Barcelona.

Squad

Out on loan

Coaching staff

Transfers

In

Loans out

Out

Loans out

Competitions

Overall

Super Cup

Premier League

League table

Results summary

Results by round

Results

Ukrainian Cup

UEFA Champions League

Group stage

Knockout stage

Squad statistics

Appearances and goals

|-
|colspan="14"|Players away from Shakhtar Donetsk on loan:

|-
|colspan="14"|Players that left Shakhtar Donetsk during the season:

|}

Goal scorers

Clean sheets

Disciplinary record

References 

Shakhtar Donetsk
2010-11
Shakhtar Donetsk
2010-11